"Homer Scissorhands" is the twentieth episode of the twenty-second season of the American animated television series The Simpsons. It first aired on the Fox network in the United States on May 8, 2011. Kristen Schaal guest stars in the episode as Taffy. This major episode sees Milhouse dating Taffy after Lisa rejected his romantic confession. Seeing the two together makes Lisa question her own feelings for him. Meanwhile, Homer becomes a hairdresser after cutting Patty's hair.

This episode was the last episode to be shown in the UK of season 22 during August, 2011. The season continued on October 30, when "500 Keys" first aired.

This episode was Steve Viksten's final television writing credit before his death on June 23, 2014.

Plot
After Bart and Lisa accidentally throw paint into Patty's hair, Homer uses garden shears to cut the remaining hair, miraculously styling it. Selma demands that Homer style her hair as well, and he soon becomes Springfield's most popular hairdresser. Soon, he is styling hair for Helen Lovejoy, Luann Van Houten, Manjula Nahasapeemapetilon and numerous other women in Springfield. However, he discovers that listening to the inane chatter upsets and angers him. He even attempts to commit suicide by drinking a jar of disinfectant. Complaining to Moe and the other barflies, Homer realises that he cannot even look at the men in the bar without seeing everything that the women dislike about them. Eventually, after declaring that he can hear the hair growing around town, Homer styles Marge's hair for a party, and they pretend that Julio created the hairstyle instead. Julio is immediately surrounded by women demanding that he style them, too.

Meanwhile, Milhouse has a life-changing experience after watching Finding Nemo from the beginning. Previously, he and Bart only watched the film from "Chapter 2", which takes place after Nemo's mother has died. Deciding that, since death can happen to a fish, it can happen to anyone, he decides to live each day as if it were his last. He professes his love for Lisa, even "writing" her a love song (the tune for which is clearly plagiarised from the English folk song "Greensleeves"). Lisa rejects his love, but he manages to impress a fifth-grade girl named Taffy (Kristen Schaal). Taffy and Milhouse begin to date, but Lisa fears that Taffy is only using him, and begins to spy on them both. Her appearance annoys Taffy, who decides that Milhouse will never love her as he is too obsessed with Lisa, and she leaves. Distraught, Milhouse asks Lisa just how upset she wants him to be in life. Lisa, feeling guilty for really hurting him, gives him a kiss to make him feel better. Milhouse asks if that means Lisa likes him.  Not sure what to say at first, Lisa eventually says that life has unexpected things to offer and urges him not to give up searching for love. Milhouse then faints off a cliff but is rescued by an eagle. Lisa just smiles, glad to see him cheered up.

Production
The plot of Homer becoming a hairdresser was also an unused side story idea from the season 4 episode "New Kid on the Block" after the planned B-story of Homer fighting with Don Rickles after Rickles insults him during a stand-up show was rejected. Kristen Schaal guest stars as Taffy, although her surname is spelled incorrectly as "Schall" in the credits. The chalkboard gag from the following episode "500 Keys" was written to correct the error. The error was later corrected for syndication.

Cultural references
The episode title is a reference to the 1990 film Edward Scissorhands directed by Tim Burton and starring Johnny Depp in the title role. During the episode, Homer tells Marge to just call him "Homer Fingerhands". Many scenes are parallels to the movie; for example the first time Homer cuts hair for money is a reference to the scene where Edward carves the ice angel with Maggie dancing as Kim does in the film. The episode's soundtrack is also inspired by the soundtrack of Edward Scissorhands.
Lady Gaga is mentioned in the episode.
While cutting the hair of Helen Lovejoy, she mentions that her husband has been basing sermons on old episodes of Seinfeld. Upon failing to "suck" at cutting her hair at the suggestion of Lenny, Homer decides to attempt to commit barbicide. This is a reference to the reunion episode of Seinfeld from Curb Your Enthusiasm, which has a joke about barbers killing themselves by drinking comb disinfectant.
 Homer's hair salon, Are We Hair Yet, is a parody of Are We There Yet?.
 Homer makes a reference to Warren Beatty and one of the films he starred in, Shampoo.
 Selma says Patty's haircut looks like Posh Spice Victoria Beckham from the Spice Girls. Homer says he was trying to copy Scary Spice Mel B's haircut.
 The song Milhouse composed to Lisa sounds exactly like "Greensleeves".
 When Homer washes Marge's hair at the end of the episode, it refers to Dead Calm, when Sam Neill washes Nicole Kidman's hair on the boat.

Reception
In its original American broadcast on May 8, 2011, "Homer Scissorhands" was viewed by an estimated 5.480 million households and received a 2.5 rating/8% share among adults between the ages of 18 and 49. This means that it was seen by 2.5% of all 18- to 49-year-olds, and 8% of all 18- to 49-year-olds watching television at the time of the broadcast. This marked a 7 percent drop in the ratings from the previous episode.

References

External links 
 
 "Homer Scissorhands" at theSimpsons.com

2011 American television episodes
The Simpsons (season 22) episodes